Rebekah Fitch (born 1 December 1995) is a Northern Irish singer-songwriter and musician, born and raised in Belfast, Northern Ireland. She released her debut EP, Broken Mind, in 2018, with a follow up EP, Lies We Tell Ourselves, in 2019. She was a runner-up in the PRS Lynsey de Paul Prize in 2018.

Personal life
Fitch is a Christian. In a 2017 interview she spoke about how, having grown up in a Christian family, her faith became fully her own whilst at University.

Discography

Extended plays

Singles

References

1995 births
Living people
Musicians from Belfast
Singer-songwriters from Northern Ireland
Pop singers from Northern Ireland
21st-century women singers from Northern Ireland
Christians from Northern Ireland